The Saudi Arabia women's national football team is the official women's national football team of the country of Saudi Arabia. The team is controlled by the Saudi Arabian Football Federation (SAFF), the governing body for football in Saudi Arabia.

Colloquially called "the Green Falcons", Saudi Arabia played their first match in 2022 against the Seychelles in a 2–0 win in a friendly tournament in the Maldives.

History

Background 
Due to the influence of religious leaders in Saudi Arabia, active opposition of political leaders and sport administrators, and systematic discrimination against women's sport, a women's national team could not exist for a long time. The creation of a FIFA-recognised women's national team was banned by law in 2008. Systemic discrimination remained intact despite limited reforms, until the death of King Abdullah in 2015.

With King Salman's ascension to the throne in 2015, talks about football reforms escalated. However, his son Mohammed bin Salman was the first to spearhead the reforms, including to women's football. Saudi Arabia allowed women to attend football games since 2017, the first step for a future creation of a women's football team.

In December 2019, the Saudi Arabian Football Federation (SAFF) organised the first unofficial women's competition in the Jeddah area. An official nationwide tournament, the amateur Saudi Women's Football League, was launched in February 2020, concentrated in three big cities: Riyadh, Jeddah and Dammam. Following the creation of the league, calls for a creation of a women's national team increased.

Inception 
On 11 August 2021, the SAFF appointed Monika Staab as head coach of the newly-established women's national team. Saudi Arabia played their first games in February 2022, taking part in a friendly tournament in Malé, Maldives. They debuted on 20 February, beating Seychelles in a 2–0 win. Following the successful debut, Lamia Bin Bahian, a board member of the SAFF, revealed a long term plan to allow the team to participate in the first FIFA Women's World Cup in the next ten years, with the aim to become a dominant force in the Gulf, West Asia and Asian level.

Results and fixtures 

 
The following is a list of match results in the last 12 months, as well as any future matches that have been scheduled.

Legend

2022

2023

Team participations, saff.com.sa

Coaching staff

Current coaching staff

Manager history
  Monika Staab (11 August 2021 – 13 February 2023)
   (13 February 2023 – present)

Players

Current squad
The following 25 players were called up for friendly matches against  on 22 and 26 February 2023.

Caps and goals correct as of 26 February 2023

Recent call-ups
The following players have been called up to the squad in the past 12 months.

INJ Player withdrew from the squad due to an injury.
PRE Preliminary squad.
SUS Player is serving a suspension.
WD Player withdrew for personal reasons.

Previous squads
SAFF Women's Friendly Tournament

Records
Active players in bold, statistics correct as of 28 September 2022.

Most-capped players

Top goalscorers

Competitive record 
So far, the team hasn't competed in the FIFA Women's World Cup, the Olympic Games, the Arab Women's Cup, the WAFF Women's Championship or the AFC Women's Asian Cup. They also haven't competed at the Asian Games yet, but as hosts for the 2034 edition they are automarically qualified.

Asian Games

*Draws include knockout matches decided on penalty kicks.

Head-to-head record 
Key

The following table shows Saudi Arabia's all-time official international record per opponent:

Last updated: Saudi Arabia vs Indonesia, 26 February 2023.

See also
 Saudi Arabia women's national under-20 football team
 Saudi Arabia women's national under-17 football team

References

External links
  
 Saudi Arabia national team website
 FIFA team profile

َArabic women's national association football teams
 
Saudi Arabia
national
2021 establishments in Saudi Arabia